Chang Chih-hao  (born 15 May 1987), or Aluken Fanu in Amis, is a Taiwanese baseball outfielder for the CTBC Brothers of the Chinese Professional Baseball League (CPBL).

He represented Taiwan at the 2009 World Port Tournament and the 2017 World Baseball Classic.

Career
Chang won the Taiwan Series with the Brothers in 2010.

On July 13, 2021, Chang underwent Tommy John surgery, ending his 2021 season.

References

1987 births
Living people
Baseball outfielders
CTBC Brothers players
Chinatrust Whales players
People from Taitung County
Taiwanese baseball players
2017 World Baseball Classic players